This list is of the Tangible Folk Cultural Properties of Japan in the Prefecture of Okinawa.

National Tangible Folk Cultural Properties
As of 1 January 2015, zero properties have been designated at a national level.

Prefectural Tangible Folk Cultural Properties
As of 1 May 2014, nineteen properties have been designated at a prefectural level.

Municipal Tangible Folk Cultural Properties
As of 1 May 2014, a further one hundred and fourteen properties have been designated at a municipal level.

Registered Tangible Folk Cultural Properties
As of 1 January 2015, one property has been registered (as opposed to designated) at a national level.

See also
 Cultural Properties of Japan
 List of Important Tangible Folk Cultural Properties
 Shisa
 Mingei

References

External links
  Cultural Properties in Okinawa Prefecture
  List of Cultural Properties in Okinawa Prefecture

Tangible Folk Cultural Properties
Tangible Folk Cultural Properties of Okinawa
Tangible Folk Cultural Properties of Okinawa